James B. Clark may refer to:
 Champ Clark (James Beauchamp Clark, 1850–1921), American politician
 James B. Clark (director) (1908–2000), American film editor and director
 James B. Clark (Canadian politician) (1867–1943), Canadian politician from Ontario
 James B. Clark, Jr. (1957–1996), murderer executed in the U.S. state of Delaware

See also
James Clark (disambiguation)